Energy Saving Trust (EST) is a British organization devoted to promoting energy efficiency, energy conservation, and the sustainable use of energy, thereby reducing carbon dioxide emissions and helping to prevent man-made climate change. It was founded in the United Kingdom as a government-sponsored initiative in 1992, following the global Earth Summit.

Energy Saving Trust is a profit for purpose organisation.   EST has regional offices in England, and country offices in Wales, Northern Ireland, and Scotland and runs numerous advice services in the UK. It maintains a comprehensive website, and a network of numerous local advice offices.

History and purpose
Energy Saving Trust was formally established in November 1992. It was formed, as a public-private partnership, in response both to the director-general of Ofgas's 1991 proposal to increase energy efficiency in natural gas use, and to the global June 1992 Earth Summit call to reduce greenhouse gas emissions and prevent global warming and climate change. In the wake of energy-supplier privatisation in the UK, EST was also specifically formed as an instrument to ensure energy conservation and carbon-emission reduction in a free-market environment.  The structure, scope, nature, and funding of EST's activities and programmes have varied over the years due to governmental policy changes; however its primary focus – on consumers and households – has remained the same. It is the largest provider of energy-saving advice, and has affected significant and measurable savings of energy, money, and carbon.

EST's main goals are to achieve the sustainable use of energy and to cut carbon dioxide emissions. It acts as a bridge between consumers, government, trade, businesses, third sector organisations, local authorities, and the energy market. EST's target audience is consumers, local authorities, energy companies, and policy makers. Among other activities, they provide: 
Free advice, information, and action plans to individuals, organizations, communities, consumers, and the private sector on how to reduce carbon emissions, use water more sustainably, and save money on energy bills 
Grants and grant-finding advice for energy-saving projects, installations, and purchases
Energy-saving certification, assurance, and accreditation services for businesses and consumer goods
Independent and authoritative research, and policy analysis, in energy-conservation areas including household energy efficiency, low-carbon transport, renewable energy, and microgeneration
Management or delivery of government programmes
Testing of low-carbon technology
Development of energy-efficient models and tools

Services provided 
EST provides grants and free advice to the public to help reduce energy use, energy bills, and greenhouse gas emissions.

For individuals, EST provides information and advice on subjects including:

Insulation
Heating and hot water
Electricity use, green electricity, and energy-efficient products and appliances
Generating renewable energy
Finding and starting community projects
Energy-saving travel and transport

For organisations, Energy Saving Trust provides numerous services including:

Green Deal and other certifications
Advice and analysis
Technology and technical resources
Transport checks, advice, information, and green certifications 
An assortment of government and local programmes
International action, advice, and bespoke consultations

Energy Industry Voluntary Redress Scheme 

Energy Saving Trust manages the Energy Industry Voluntary Redress Scheme on behalf of Office of Gas and Electricity Markets (Ofgem). The Redress Scheme was launched by Ofgem in 2018 to support vulnerable energy consumers and fund the development of energy products and services to reduce the environmental impact of energy use. It is funded by energy companies who have breached their operating licence conditions.

In the Energy Industry Voluntary Redress Scheme's thirteenth round of funding, started in October 2021, £11.5 million was made available to charities across England, Scotland and Wales.

See also
Carbon Trust
Low Carbon Building Programme
Energy use and conservation in the United Kingdom
Energy policy of the United Kingdom

References

External links 

Department of Energy and Climate Change
Energy conservation in the United Kingdom
Energy organizations
Environmental organisations based in the United Kingdom
Organisations based in the London Borough of Tower Hamlets
Organizations established in 1993
Private companies limited by guarantee of the United Kingdom
Sustainability organizations